A bookbinder is someone who binds books.

Bookbinder may also refer to:

Alan Bookbinder (born 1956), British journalist and Master of Downing College, Cambridge
Elaine Bookbinder (born 1945), singer better known as Elkie Brooks
Roy Bookbinder (born 1943), American guitarist and singer
Hyman Bookbinder, former leader of the American Jewish Committee

See also
Old Original Bookbinder's, a restaurant